Old Town station may refer to:
 Old Town station (Staten Island Railway), New York, United States
 Oldtown railway station, Letterkenny, Ireland
 Old Town station (A-train), Lewisville, Texas, United States
 Old Town Transit Center, San Diego, California, United States
 Old Town/Chinatown MAX Station, Portland, Oregon, United States
 King Street–Old Town station, Alexandria, Virginia, United States